The 1926 Millsaps Majors football team was an American football team that represented Millsaps College as a member of the Southern Intercollegiate Athletic Association (SIAA) during the 1926 college football season. In their fifth year under head coach Herman F. Zimoski, the team compiled a 2–8 record.

Schedule

References

Millsaps
Millsaps Majors football seasons
Millsaps Majors football